Kushk or Koshk or Keveshk or Kushak or Kooshk may refer to:

Afghanistan
 Kushk, Afghanistan, a town in Kushk District, Herat Province
 Kushk District in the northern part of Herat Province, Afghanistan
 Kushk River, a river along the boundary between Afghanistan and Turkmenistan

Iran

Alborz Province
 Kushk-e Bala, a village in Karaj County

Chaharmahal and Bakhtiari Province
 Kushk, alternate name of Shahrak-e Kushka, a village in Chaharmahal and Bakhtiari Province

East Azerbaijan Province
 Kushk, East Azerbaijan, a village in Shabestar County

Fars Province
 Kushk, Arsanjan, a village in Arsanjan County
 Kushk-e Banian, a village in Fasa County
 Kushk-e Qazi, a village in Fasa County
 Kushk-e Qazi Rural District, in Fasa County
 Kushk, Firuzabad, in Firuzabad County
 Kushk-e Qasem, in Firuzabad County
 Kushk-e Hasanabad, in Jahrom County
 Kushk Sar, in Jahrom County
 Kushk-e Sar Tang, in Jahrom County
 Kushk-e Baqeri, in Kazerun County
 Kushk-e Pas Qalat, in Kazerun County
 Kushk, Kharameh, in Kharameh County
 Kooshk, Lamerd, in Lamerd County
 Kushk, Marvdasht, in Marvdasht County
 Kushk-e Sofla, Fars, in Rostam County
 Kushk-e Hezar, in Sepidan County
 Kushk-e Hezar Rural District, in Sepidan County
 Kushk-e Mohammadabad, in Sepidan County
 Kushk-e Bidak, in Shiraz County
 Kushk-e Khalil, in Shiraz County
 Kushk-e Mowla, in Shiraz County

Hormozgan Province
 Kushk, Hormozgan, a village in Bandar Lengeh County
 Kushk-e Nar, a village in Hormozgan Province
 Kushk-e Nar Rural District, a rural district in Hormozgan Province
 Kushk-e Nar District, a district in Hormozgan Province

Isfahan Province
 Kushk, Iran, a city in Khomeyni Shahr County
 Kushk-e Kuchak, a village in Mobarakeh County
Kushk-e Agha mohammad, located in ghamsar, near of kashan

Kerman Province
 Kushk, Kerman, a village in Anbarabad County
 Kushk-e Kalejak, a village in Anbarabad County
 Kushk-e Mur, a village in Anbarabad County
 Kushk-e Borj, a village in Baft County
 Kushk-e Olya, Kerman, a village in Baft County
 Kushk-e Sofla, Kerman, a village in Baft County
 Kushk-e Mardan, a village in Shahr-e Babak County

Khuzestan Province
 Kushk, Khuzestan, a village in Andika County
 Kushk-e Aqa Jan, a village in Andika County
 Kushk Rural District (Khuzestan Province), in Andika County

Kohgiluyeh and Boyer-Ahmad Province
 Kushk-e Zafari, a village in Basht County
 Kushk-e Abul, a village in Kohgiluyeh County
 Kushk, Kohgiluyeh, a village in Kohgiluyeh County
 Kushk, Charusa, a village in Kohgiluyeh County
 Kushk, Dishmok, a village in Kohgiluyeh County
 Kushk-e Amir ol Momeyin, a village in Kohgiluyeh County
 Kushk-e Ghandi, a village in Kohgiluyeh County

Lorestan Province
 Kushk, Borujerd, a village in Borujerd County
 Kushk, Dorud, a village in Dorud County

Qazvin Province
 Kushk, Qazvin, a village in Qazvin County

Razavi Khorasan Province
 Kushk, Khoshab, a village in Khoshab County
 Kushk, Nishapur, a village in Nishapur County
 Kushk-e Bagh, a village in Sabzevar County
 Kushk-e Mehdi, a village in Mashhad County

Semnan Province
 Kushk-e Arbabi, a village in Garmsar County
 Kushk-e Khaleseh-ye Bala, a village in Garmsar County
 Kushk-e Khaleseh-ye Pain, a village in Garmsar County

South Khorasan Province
 Kushk, South Khorasan, a village in Birjand County

Tehran Province
 Kushk-e Fashapuyeh, a village in Rey County

Yazd Province
 Kushk, Bafq, a village in Bafq County
 Kushk Rural District (Yazd Province), in Bafq County
 Kushk, Khatam, a village in Khatam County

See also
 Kushkak (disambiguation)